Wayne City is a village in Wayne County, Illinois, United States. The population was 994 at the 2020 census.

Geography

Demographics

As of the census of 2000, there were 1,089 people, 479 households, and 314 families residing in the village. The racial makeup of the village was 99.36% White, 0.09% Native American, 0.09% from other races, and 0.46% from two or more races. Hispanic or Latino of any race were 0.55% of the population.

There were 479 households, out of which 30.7% had children under the age of 18 living with them, 52.4% were married couples living together, 9.8% had a female householder with no husband present, and 34.4% were non-families. 33.4% of all households were made up of individuals, and 20.3% had someone living alone who was 65 years of age or older. The average household size was 2.27 and the average family size was 2.86.

In the village, the population was spread out, with 25.3% under the age of 18, 8.0% from 18 to 24, 24.2% from 25 to 44, 20.5% from 45 to 64, and 21.9% who were 65 years of age or older. The median age was 37 years. For every 100 females, there were 87.1 males. For every 100 females age 18 and over, there were 79.1 males.

The median income for a household in the village was $27,009, and the median income for a family was $33,750. Males had a median income of $28,269 versus $21,842 for females. The per capita income for the village was $13,333. About 13.6% of families and 18.4% of the population were below the poverty line, including 22.0% of those under age 18 and 17.7% of those age 65 or over.

Culture

The town hosts an annual festival called Bean Days which typically involves a parade, a pageant, and a rodeo, as well as a free ham and bean dinner with corn bread. The local 4-H club, Wayne City 4-H Club, is also responsible for setting up and serving the communal dinner.

The Wayne City School District's original school facility was originally built in the 69696s, but was torn down after the 2015-2016 school year to make room for a new facility.  The new school's construction began in 2015 and ended in the middle of 2016 before the start of the school year.

References

External links
 Village of Wayne City
 Wayne City Bean Days
 Wayne City Baptist Church
 Wayne City Church of God
 First Christian Church of Wayne City
 Church of the Harvest

Villages in Wayne County, Illinois
Villages in Illinois